Rugby union in Switzerland is a minor but growing sport.

Governing body
The Swiss Rugby Federation was founded in 1972 and joined the IRFB in 1988.

History
Like neighbouring Germany, Austria and France, Swiss rugby is actually amongst the oldest in the world. The earliest recorded match in Switzerland was in 1869, and Lausanne RFC can claim to be as old as Blackheath.

However, Swiss rugby continued at a very low key for over a hundred years. The World Wars and other global upheavals hindered the game, and it was really the presence of a number of ex-patriates working in the banking industry, or as tax exiles, who helped keep the game going.

In 1974, a side from Basel toured France and were on the end of record breaking defeats. They lost 127-0 to Grenoble, 104-3 to Thonon and 116-0 to Annecy.  The captain of the Basel team, Pierre Langlois said, "We conceded 73 tries, I think. We even had a penalty try given against us when we were losing by 100 points."

Swiss rugby continued in a haphazard manner during the 1970s and 80s, for example,  when  was due to play Bellinzona RFC in Italy, two of their players were delayed by a landslide.  In order to make up numbers, a journalist and their coach driver were added to the squad. They did so well in the game that they were invited to subsequent training sessions.

The Swiss Federation undertook an intensive development program in the 1980s, under Evelyne Oberson, and managed to gain a number of new native players. Ms Oberson, working often alone in Lausanne as a volunteer, was in every way a key element to Swiss rugby as, through her high level of personal organisation and admin skills, for the most part managed the (then) small Federation almost single-handedly.  She was essential to Swiss rugby holding together from the 80s until its current format.

In 1989, Chris Thau claimed that Switzerland had around 1,000 players (a number which has increased somewhat since then).

There are at least thirty Swiss clubs at present.

Swiss rugby is now dominated by home grown players, and for some the bright lights of French and Italian rugby might be a draw.

More recently, 2006-07 Heineken Cup clash  between the French side Bourgoin and Irish rugby's Munster was moved from Bourgoin's home ground, to the Stade de Genève (Geneva Stadium). The stadium's capacity is 30,000, and attendance on the day was 16,255.

Notable Swiss players include:

 Eric Planes, scrum half
 Jean-Marc Morand, no 8
 Viktor von Burg, captain.

Local clubs
Grasshopper Club Zürich
Hermance Région Rugby Club
Lausanne Université Club Rugby
Nyon Rugby Club
Rugby Club Avusy
 Rugby Club CERN Meyrin-St.Genis
Rugby Club Genève Plan-les-Ouates
Rugby Club Yverdon-les-Bains
Rugby Football Club Basel
Rugby Club Lucerne
Zug Rugby Club
Rugby Club Würenlos
Rugby Club Bern
Rugby Club Palezieux (formerly Haute-Broye)
Stade Lausanne Rugby Club
Rugby Club Schaffhausen
Rugby Club Winterthur
Neuchâtel-Sports Rugby Club
RC Bagnes (Val de Bagnes-Verbier)

See also 
 Switzerland national rugby union team

References 
 Cotton, Fran (Ed.) (1984) The Book of Rugby Disasters & Bizarre Records. Compiled by Chris Rhys. London. Century Publishing. 
 Richards, Huw A Game for Hooligans: The History of Rugby Union (Mainstream Publishing, Edinburgh, 2007)
 Thau, Chris  World Cup Preliminaries in Starmer-Smith, Nigel & Robertson, Ian (eds) The Whitbread Rugby World '90 (Lennard Books, 1989)

External links
 Federation Suisse du Rugby
 Archives du Rugby: Suisse
 Rugby Schweiz
 Le Rugby Suisse depuis 1972